Witthoefft House is a historic home located at Armonk, Westchester County, New York. It was built in 1957, and is an International Style dwelling on a concrete slab foundation and stone covered concrete retaining walls.  It features exposed structural steel, white glazed-brick walls, and full elevations of glass.  The house is perched atop rock outcroppings in a semi-rural setting.

It was added to the National Register of Historic Places in 2011.

See also
National Register of Historic Places listings in northern Westchester County, New York

References

Houses on the National Register of Historic Places in New York (state)
Architecture in New York (state)
Houses completed in 1957
Houses in Westchester County, New York
National Register of Historic Places in Westchester County, New York